Metinvest Shipping ("Skif Shipping LLC" till July, the 25th, 2012). was founded in 2000. As of 12 August 2006, Skif Shipping Ltd. is a subsidiary of Metinvest Holding Ltd.
The company has branch offices in the cities of Mariupol, Sevastopol, Dnipro and Odessa. The Company employs people also in Berdyansk, Yuzhne, Chornomorsk, Mykolaiv and Izmail.

Company profile 

The Company’s operations cover the whole range of cargo transportation services: from railway carriage to port operations: customs clearance, cargo expediting, freight quantity control, Laboratory Tests, ship's agency services, chartering of seaborne vessels.

Skif-Shipping is the only company which has joint operations with Mariupol Merchant Sea Port State Enterprise.

References

External links 
 Skif-Shipping Dnipropetrovsk branch website
 System Capital Management – official website

SCM Holdings
Logistics companies